Adi Tekelezan Subregion (Tigrinya:ንኡስ ዞባ ዓዲ ተከሌዛን)is a subregion in the northwestern Anseba region (Zoba Anseba) of Eritrea. The capital lies at Adi Tekelezan.

References

Subregions of Eritrea